Des Arc may refer to:

 Des Arc, Arkansas
 Des Arc, Missouri